The Rouse Ball Professorship of English Law is a senior professorship in English law at the University of Cambridge, established in 1927 by a bequest from the mathematician W. W. Rouse Ball. In establishing the office, Rouse Ball expressed a hope "that it might be found practicable for such Professor or Reader to include in his or her lectures and treatment historical and philosophical aspects of the subject".

Its holders are chosen based on international recognition in their field of scholarship, having an outstanding record in research and publication, strategic vision and commitment to developing their field of scholarship within the University of Cambridge, and the Faculty of Law's profile within that field, and having a commitment to excellence in learning and teaching.

On 1 October 2019, Professor Louise Gullifer was appointed to the professorship, following the retirement of her predecessor David Feldman.

Rouse Ball Professors of English Law

See also
 Rouse Ball Professor of Mathematics
Downing Professor of the Laws of England
Regius Professor of Civil Law (Cambridge)

References

 
1927 establishments in England
English law
English Law, Rouse Ball
School of the Humanities and Social Sciences, University of Cambridge
English Law, Rouse Ball